Magneuptychia mimas is a species of butterfly of the family Nymphalidae. It is found in Bolivia and Colombia.

References

Butterflies described in 1905
Taxa named by Frederick DuCane Godman
Euptychiina
Nymphalidae of South America